The 2004 United States presidential election in Idaho took place on November 2, 2004, and was part of the 2004 presidential election. Voters chose four representatives, or electors to the Electoral College, who voted for president and vice president.

Idaho was won by incumbent President George W. Bush by a 38.1 point margin of victory. Prior to the election, all twelve news organizations considered this a state Bush would win, or otherwise considered as a safe red state. No Democratic presidential nominee won the state since Lyndon B. Johnson in 1964 and even then it was close. In 2004, President George W. Bush easily won the state and every congressional district and county, except the Democratic stronghold of Blaine County. , this is the last election in which Latah County voted for a Republican presidential candidate.

With 68.38 percent of the popular vote, Idaho would prove to be Bush's third strongest state in the 2004 election after neighboring Utah and Wyoming.

Caucuses
 2004 Idaho Democratic presidential caucuses

Campaign

Predictions
There were 12 news organizations who made state-by-state predictions of the election. Here are their last predictions before election day.

Polling
Only one pre-election poll was taken, which gave Bush 59%, Kerry 30%, and Nader 3%.

Fundraising
Bush raised $371,495. Kerry raised $359,011.

Advertising and visits
Neither campaign visited or campaigned here during the fall election.

Analysis
With a substantial Mormon population, Idaho is one of the most reliable GOP bastions in the country. Both senators and representatives are Republican. It has not supported a Democratic presidential candidate since Lyndon B. Johnson in 1964. Democrats have not held the state legislature since 1958, though Democrats held the governorship from 1971 to 1995.

Results

Results by county

By congressional district
Bush won both congressional districts.

Electors

Technically the voters of Idaho cast their ballots for electors: representatives to the Electoral College. Idaho is allocated 4 electors because it has 2 congressional districts and 2 senators. All candidates who appear on the ballot or qualify to receive write-in votes must submit a list of 4 electors, who pledge to vote for their candidate and his or her running mate. Whoever wins the majority of votes in the state is awarded all 4 electoral votes. Their chosen electors then vote for president and vice president. Although electors are pledged to their candidate and running mate, they are not obligated to vote for them. An elector who votes for someone other than his or her candidate is known as a faithless elector.

The electors of each state and the District of Columbia met on December 13, 2004, to cast their votes for president and vice president. The Electoral College itself never meets as one body. Instead the electors from each state and the District of Columbia met in their respective capitols.

The following were the members of the Electoral College from Idaho. All were pledged to and voted for George Bush and Dick Cheney.
Pete T. Cenarrusa
 Debbie Field
 Sandra Patano
 John Sandy

See also
 United States presidential elections in Idaho
 Presidency of George W. Bush

Notes

References

External links
Dave Leip's U.S. Election Atlas
Archives.gov

2004 Idaho elections
Idaho
2004